Caseyology is the sixth, fifth full-length, studio album by American punk rock band D.I., released in 2002 on Cleopatra Records. The title refers to the singer's his first name (Casey) and the word "ology" may be a reference to the word anthology. Despite the title, it's technically not a compilation album, but it does feature re-recordings and live versions of selected songs from the band's previous releases.

Much confusion has sprung up about the Caseyology album. It wasn't listed on their , and the music press often referred to 2007's On the Western Front as the group's first release since State of Shock in 1994. Some sources list it as a compilation album.

Track listing
 "Persecution for Profit" (3:18)
 "Stick to Your Guns" (2:15)
 "Anthony the Psycho" (2:09)
 "Richard Hung Himself" (3:30)
 "Black Surf" (3:01)
 "She Don't Like Me" (4:47)
 "Anxiety Attack" (2:55)
 "Ride the Toxic Surf" (2:58)
 "Perfect Girl" (2:39)
 "Johnny's Got a Problem" (2:10)
 "Tragedy" (live) (2:44)
 "No Way" (live) (1:52)
 "Euthanasia" (live) (2:09)
 "Guns" (live) (2:27)
 "Pervert Nurse" (live) (3:04)

"Richard Hung Himself" is a re-recording of the song from their 1983 EP Team Goon, while "Stick to Your Guns" and "Johnny's Got a Problem" are re-recordings of songs from their 1986 album Horse Bites Dog Cries.
The last five tracks were recorded at Korn Beach, California.

References

D.I. (band) albums
2002 albums
Cleopatra Records albums